Fred Dennett (June 27, 1863 – September 28, 1928) was the 32nd Commissioner of the General Land Office from 1908-1913.

Biography
Fred Dennett was the son of Rev. D. Richard and Eleanor (Garforth) Dennett. He was born at Valparaiso, Chile on June 27, 1863. He was educated at Malvern College, Great Malvern, England. He was  a graduate of George Washington University Law School with LL.B. in 1894 and LL.M. in 1896. Dennett married Elizabeth A. Comerford of Morris, Illinois on November 23, 1892. He edited and part-owned the Milton, North Dakota Globe. He was a member of the North Dakota House of Representatives.

Fred Dennet died September 28, 1928 at Washington, D.C. and is buried at Fort Lincoln Cemetery in Brentwood, Maryland.

References

External links

General Land Office Commissioners
Members of the North Dakota House of Representatives
George Washington University Law School alumni
People educated at Malvern College
People from Cavalier County, North Dakota
1863 births
1928 deaths